Edward Francis "Max" Hicks (November 6, 1892 – November 12, 1944) was a professional American football player and coach in the early National Football League (NFL)–then called the American Professional Football Association (AFPA). He played in 1920 for the Hammond Pros and later served the team as a player-coach in 1921.

References

1892 births
1944 deaths
American football ends
Geneva Golden Tornadoes football players
Hammond Pros coaches
Hammond Pros players
Player-coaches